Events in the year 1718 in Norway.

Incumbents
Monarch: Frederick IV

Events
 29 August - 10,000 men under the command of Lieutenant-general Carl Gustaf Armfeldt attacked Trøndelag from Jemtland.
 30 November - King Karl XII was shot and killed at the Siege of Fredriksten fortress.

Arts and literature

Births
26 February - Johan Ernst Gunnerus, bishop and botanist (died 1773)
29 December - Ole Nilsen Weierholt, wood carver (died 1792)

Deaths
8 February – Henrik Adeler,  civil servant and politician (born 1660).
16 May – Jonas Danilssønn Ramus, priest and historian (born 1649)
9 September – Caspar Herman Hausmann, general, lumber merchant and squire (born 1653)
30 November – King Karl XII of Sweden (born 1682)

References